(originally known as North Eastern Wrestling) is a Japanese professional wrestling promotion founded by The Great Sasuke on October 1, 1992. It was the first independent wrestling promotion in Japan to not base its operations in Tokyo, but rather in Morioka, Iwate. Since the promotion is primarily focused on the Lucha libre style of wrestling, many of their wrestlers don masks and special motifs as they compete in the ring. However, Michinoku Pro has accepted wrestlers from various styles (such as shoot style and strong style) and backgrounds over the years. In 2003, Sasuke left the running of the promotion to Jinsei Shinzaki.

History
Michinoku Pro Wrestling (Michinoku Pro or M-Pro) was founded on October 1, 1992 by The Great Sasuke as a community-based promotion for the northeastern greater Tohoku region of Japan. Their first-ever pre-show was held on November 27, 1992 in Takizawa City, although due to disputes with the Universal Wrestling Federation (UWF), the promotion was put on the back-burner for the next several months. Gran Hamada joined M-Pro, and their first-ever show was held on Match 16, 1993 in Yahaba, Iwate.

The stable Kaientai Deluxe (海援隊Deluxe) was formed in 1996. Dick Togo, Men's Teioh, TAKA Michinoku, Shoichi Funaki, and Hanzo Nakajima worked as young protagonists looking to make a break in the business. This group competed against The Great Sasuke and Super Delfin. After a couple of years, TAKA and the rest of KAIENTAI moved to the US to compete.

In 1997, Michinoku Pro Wrestling entered into a working relationship with the World Wrestling Federation, with M-Pro founder The Great Sasuke wrestling in two matches for the promotion. The WWF would also send talent to Japan, such as The Undertaker, who would wrestle against M-Pro mainstay Jinsei Shinzaki. During this period, the WWF was planning on holding a tournament to crown the first holder of the WWF Light Heavyweight Championship. It has been theorized in the wrestling press that although Great Sasuke was pushed to be the winner of the tournament, he had bragged to the Japanese media that he would only defend the title in Japan, and would refuse to drop the title on WWF television. When the WWF heard Sasuke's comments, he was removed from the tournament, fired, and the MPW/WWF working agreement was terminated. However, speaking on his Something to Wrestle With podcast in July 2017, Bruce Prichard disputed this version of events, suggesting the WWF never entered into any formal agreement with Sasuke, and that the company was only interested in signing TAKA Michinoku. Michinoku Pro Wrestling alumnus TAKA Michinoku would end up winning the title.

By 1998, the promotion had gone on a temporary hiatus after Sasuke suffered a knee injury that required surgery. Delfin took charge of the promotion for the time being, but on January 17, 1999, he announced that he would be withdrawing from the promotion and that many of the wrestlers and backstage personnel would be joining him. This was in part due to differences regarding the direction of the promotion. Delfin was joined by Gran Naniwa, Masato Yakushiji, Naohiro Hoshikawa, Masaru Seno, Hayato Kigawa, and referee Yukinori Matsui. Delfin formed Osaka Pro Wrestling. TAKA Michinoku and Dick Togo later returned after their stint in the US and competed from time to time. In 2003, Sasuke ran for public office, and Jinsei Shinzaki took over as the president of the promotion. The 10th anniversary of the promotion was held on November 2, 2003 at the Ariake Colosseum in Tokyo, Japan.

In July 2004, the promotion underwent a revival as Ultimo Dragon disbanded his then Toryumon X promotion and sent his talent to join the promotion, which was then dubbed Shinsei Michinoku Pro-Wrestling. Bear Fukuda, Ken45°, Murcielago, and Manabu Murakami were the first to join the promotion. Then in October, Taro Nohashi, Dynamite Tohoku, and Shu and Kei Sato joined the promotion. Then at the end of that year SUGI, Rasse, Kagetora, and Manabu Murakami made their debuts.

On December 13, 2013 Kenoh left the promotion and vacated the Tohoku Junior Heavyweight Championship due to signing with Pro Wrestling Noah. In 2014, Michinoku Pro reactivated the Okinawa Wrestling Championship which was won by Eisa8.

On December 13, 2019 at the Korakuen Hall, the promotion had a sellout, standing-room-only event with an attendance of 1,890, the highest reported attendance at the Korakuen Hall to date for a pro-wrestling event since April 2015.

Current roster

Championships and tournaments

Current

Tournaments

Former

Notable alumni

Tiger Mask IV
Gran Hamada
Shiryu
Gran Naniwa
Taka Michinoku
Kenoh
Mango Fukuda
Yoshitsune
Mr. JL
Super Delfin
Shoichi Funaki
Tony Stradlin
Bobby Blaze
Wellington Wilkins Jr.
MEN'S Teioh
Minoru Fujita
CIMA
Sumo Fujii
Judo Suwa
Ikuto Hidaka
Curry Man
Danny Boy Collins
Dynamite Kid
Johnny Saint
Undertaker
Misaki Ohata

See also
Universal Lucha Libre
Universal Wrestling Association
Toryumon

References

External links
 
 A Tribute to Michinoku Pro-Wrestling

Japanese professional wrestling promotions
Sport in Morioka
Lucha libre
1992 establishments in Japan